Ed Shervington (born 11 March 1985, in Newport), is a Welsh rugby union player, in the position of hooker for Wasps

Born in Newport, Shervington debuted for Neath RFC 2003. After signing for Ospreys, he made his debut in September 2006, as a replacement against Ulster . Shervington was also allocated to play for Neath RFC in the Principality Premiership. Shervington has represented Wales at U18, U19 and U21 levels.

Shervington then joined Worcester Warriors. He enjoyed a memorable debut season during the 2010/11 campaign. He has gone on to make 65 appearances for Worcester Warriors during his first three seasons at the club and signed contract extensions in 2011 and 2013.

Shervington signed for Wasps in 2014 leaving Worcester Warriors after four seasons, making 95 appearances for the Midlands club.

References

External links
Ospreys Profile
Worcester Warriors Profile
Wasps Profile

1985 births
Living people
Rugby union players from Newport, Wales
Welsh rugby union players
Gloucester Rugby players
Worcester Warriors players
Sportspeople from Gloucestershire
Ospreys (rugby union) players
Wasps RFC players
Bristol Bears players
Rugby union hookers